Benjamin Lafayette Jefferson (October 26, 1871 – 1950) in 1913 was United States Envoy Extraordinary and Minister Plenipotentiary of Nicaragua appointed by Woodrow Wilson.

Biography
He was born in Columbus, Georgia on October 26, 1871 to Rollin Jefferson and Matta Virgina Harp. He married Clarinte B. Duquette on December 21, 1898. He was a Democrat and a dentist. Jefferson was member of Colorado House of Representatives from 1898 to 1900 and a member of Colorado State Senate from 1900 to 1908. Presidential Elector for Colorado, 1908; U.S. Minister to Nicaragua, 1913-1921. He was an unsuccessful candidate in the primary for the Governor of Colorado in 1922. delegate to Democratic National Convention from Colorado, 1928. Methodist. Member, Freemasons. He died in 1950.

References

1871 births
1950 deaths
Democratic Party Colorado state senators
Democratic Party members of the Colorado House of Representatives
Ambassadors of the United States to Nicaragua
American dentists
American Methodist clergy
Methodists from Colorado
20th-century American diplomats
20th-century Methodist ministers
American Freemasons